Kaborno  is a village in the administrative district of Gmina Purda, within Olsztyn County, Warmian-Masurian Voivodeship, in northern Poland. It is located in Warmia.

Several historic houses and two Warmian old wayside shrines are located in Kaborno.

References

Kaborno